Bernardo de Souza Oliveira (born June 8, 1993) is a Brazilian athlete who competes in recurve archery.

He was one of the most successful athletes in the Brazilian team at the 2010 South American Games, in Medellin, Colombia, winning six medals total, 4 gold, one silver and one bronze.

References

External links
 

1993 births
Living people
Brazilian male archers
Sportspeople from Brasília
Archers at the 2015 Pan American Games
Archers at the 2019 Pan American Games
Pan American Games bronze medalists for Brazil
Archers at the 2016 Summer Olympics
Olympic archers of Brazil
Pan American Games medalists in archery
South American Games gold medalists for Brazil
South American Games silver medalists for Brazil
South American Games bronze medalists for Brazil
South American Games medalists in archery
Competitors at the 2010 South American Games
Medalists at the 2015 Pan American Games
20th-century Brazilian people
21st-century Brazilian people